Mike Pearse is a cartoonist notable for the work he has drawn and written for The Beano comic. His first multi-page strip, debuted in August 1999 and was called "It's A Funny Old Game." It was 24 pages in length and it is the first time in Beano's history to be the only featured story. Since then he has created work for The Bash Street Kids, the Three Bears, and other Beano characters. Mike Pearse is recognized for his unique and highly detailed artwork, animated characters and quick-witted storylines. Nowadays he's working for Studio Beer, an advertising agency in the Netherlands.

List of Work
 It's A Funny Old game, Beano #2978 14 August 1999
 The Great Bash Street Nativity Play, Beano #2997, 25 December 1999
 Finders Keepers, Beano #3025, 8 July 2000
 A Nightmare on Bash Street, Beano #3041, 28 October 2000
 Dennis's Big Birthday Party, Beano #3061, 17 March 2001
 Continuous artist for The Bash Street Kids Singled Out. First appearance Beano #3226, 15 May 2004. Continued until 2009
 Continuous artist for The Three Bears. First appearance Beano #2974, 1999 
 The Bash Street Kids in Space Cadets 2009
 The Bash Street Kids Annual 2010

References

External links
 Mike Pearse - Imaginary Column

British cartoonists
British comics artists
Living people
The Beano people
Year of birth missing (living people)